Micralestes is a genus of African tetras.  There are currently 17 species in this genus.

Species 

 Micralestes acutidens (W. K. H. Peters, 1852) (Sharptooth tetra)
 Micralestes ambiguus Géry, 1995
 Micralestes argyrotaenia Trewavas, 1936
 Micralestes comoensis Poll & Román, 1967
 Micralestes congicus Poll, 1967
 Micralestes eburneensis Daget, 1965
 Micralestes elongatus Daget, 1957 (Elongated Turkana robber)
 Micralestes fodori Matthes, 1965
 Micralestes holargyreus (Günther, 1873)
 Micralestes humilis Boulenger, 1899
 Micralestes lualabae Poll, 1967
 Micralestes occidentalis (Günther, 1899)
 Micralestes pabrensis (Román, 1966)
 Micralestes sardina Poll, 1938
 Micralestes schelly Stiassny & Mamonekene, 2007
 Micralestes stormsi Boulenger, 1902
 Micralestes vittatus (Boulenger, 1917)

 
Alestidae
Fish of Africa
Taxa named by George Albert Boulenger
Taxonomy articles created by Polbot